Las Últimas Noticias is a Chilean, daily middle market tabloid newspaper owned by El Mercurio SAP. This company publishes various newspapers for a different audience: El Mercurio people look up to and ability to view, mainly close to the reading, La Segunda mainly a diary of "synthesis" news and evening edition, and Las Últimas Noticias is made profile tabloid, focused mainly on entertainment and gossip, so it is one of the best-selling newspapers in the country.

History

The newspaper was founded on November 15, 1902 by the owner of El Mercurio, Agustín Edwards Mac Clure, after having made a trip to the United States as to the progress of the press. From that trip, Edwards would implement a series of reforms in his company, starting with the transformation of El Mercurio into a morning newspaper, and creating Las Últimas Noticias de El Mercurio 'The Latest News of El Mercurio' (posted in the afternoon). The first director of Las Últimas Noticias was the writer Joaquín Diaz Garcés.

In 1928, Las Últimas Noticias went from broadsheet to tabloid format. In 1931, the overabundance of information generated during the fall of President Carlos Ibáñez del Campo, necessitated the emergence of a segunda edición de Las Últimas Noticias (second edition of Las Últimas Noticias), which would result in today's evening newspaper La Segunda.

Over time, Las Últimas Noticias becomes a morning, aimed at the middle and with a strong emphasis on law enforcement issues. This model brings a strong success until the 1980s, when he published, for example, Ñoñobañez comic, Calvin and Hobbes and Condorito. However, with the return to democracy, the consumption habits of Chileans begin to change and the newspaper reports no longer the same interest as before in the population.

In 1994, Las Últimas Noticias became the first Chilean newspaper produced entirely in digital. On July 19 of that year, at 18:42 hours, was sent from their offices in Bellavista 0112 street the first page of electronic test on the press page of El Mercurio, via fiber optics.

Ente late 1990 and early 2000, the daily newspaper becomes an entertainment media (discarding most of its supplements), approaching and adapting to the styles of the British Daily Mirror and American The New York Post, getting so for some time become the best selling in Chile (today is the third most circulation). It also has an online edition since mid-1990, in internet, that every day it can read news for free via this medium.

External links

Newspapers published in Chile
Publications established in 1902
Mass media in Santiago